Spring Hill is a neighborhood of Mobile, in Mobile County, Alabama.  Located on a tall broad hill 6 miles (10 km) to the west of downtown Mobile, it has one of the highest elevations in the area.  Originally a summer retreat community, it was eventually encompassed and annexed by the City of Mobile after 1820.  It gained its name from a number of natural springs at the site.

History
Overlooking the surrounding landscape, Spring Hill began to be extensively settled in the first half of the 19th century. Among its first inhabitants were former French Bonapartists from the failed Vine and Olive Colony in Marengo County, Alabama. With Alabama statehood in 1819, during the 1820s, the city of Mobile and private developers bought what became Spring Hill. Between 1820 and 1827, the government of Mobile purchased three-fourths of section 14 from the U.S. Congress. Joshua Collins acquired  of another section and subdivided  of it into  lots. At the time, the majority of the land surrounding Mobile, outside of what is now downtown, was mosquito-infested swamp. With the city plagued by extreme humidity, heat, rain, and yellow fever epidemics during the warm months, people began to realize that the western hills outside of the city tended to remain relatively free of fever and disease. Many wealthy Mobilians soon built summer residences on lots in Spring Hill. The earliest houses of the 1830s and 1840s tended to be cottages, with many in the Gulf Coast cottage style. Large country houses in the Greek Revival style came to dominate by the 1850s and later.

Michael Portier, the Roman Catholic Bishop of Mobile, purchased  in Spring Hill in 1830 for the establishment of Spring Hill College, initially a Jesuit seminary and boarding school.  It is the oldest institution of higher education in Alabama, the oldest Catholic college in the South and fifth oldest in the United States.  In January 1832, construction began on an aqueduct of cast iron and wooden pipes to bring water into Mobile from a spring on the hill.  It became the Mobile Aqueduct Company, the forerunner of what is today the Mobile Area Water and Sewer System.

Transportation improvements began in 1839, when a horse-drawn wagonette line connected the Hill to downtown.  A toll road, now known as Old Shell Road, was completed in 1850. It was built by laying down a bed of crushed oyster shells.  The Spring Hill Railroad was established in 1860, but sometimes required beasts of burden to assist the steam locomotive up the steep incline to Spring Hill.  With improved transportation, Spring Hill soon became home to summer retreat hotels.  The Battle brothers established their Battle House Hotel in Mobile in 1852; then soon afterwards they built another at Spring Hill called the Spring Hill Inn.  It sat amidst  on the south side of Old Shell Road and included a lake and bathing pavilion.  The Spring Hill Hotel opened for business in 1886.  1893 saw the completion of an electric trolley line along Old Shell Road to the intersection of what is today McGregor Avenue.  After being destroyed by fire during the first decade of the twentieth century, a new, larger Spring Hill Hotel, with a tall central tower, was built in its place.  It too, was destroyed by fire in 1918.  The Spring Hill Inn was also destroyed by fire around this time.  With the popularity of retreat hotels diminished by this time, neither structure was rebuilt.

Historic sites

Spring Hill has a number of historic sites that are listed on the National Register of Historic Places.  These include the Beal-Gaillard House (1836), Carolina Hall (1832), Center-Gaillard House (1829), Collins-Marston House (1832), Collins-Robinson House (1843), James Arthur Morrison House (1926), Pfau-Crichton Cottage (1862), Saint Paul's Episcopal Chapel (1859), the Sodality Chapel (1850), the Spring Hill College Quadrangle (1869–1910), and Stewartfield (1849).

Geography

Notes

References

Populated places in Mobile County, Alabama